Simple Creatures is an American pop rock duo that was formed by vocalist, bassist, and keyboardist Mark Hoppus of Blink-182 and vocalist, guitarist, and keyboardist Alex Gaskarth of All Time Low. Based in Los Angeles, the duo released their first EP, Strange Love, on March 29, 2019. Their second EP, Everything Opposite, was released on October 11, 2019.

Biography
Alex Gaskarth grew up a fan of Blink-182, and his group, All Time Low, eventually toured with the band on its 2016 California Tour. Mark Hoppus, the band's bassist, had become friends with Gaskarth over the years and the two had always spoken about collaborating at some point. Following completion of the California tour dates in 2017, Hoppus fell into a depression, and re-entered the studio hoping to record with artists he had always wanted to work with. He called Gaskarth first, and the two ended up writing several songs in the first sessions together. The project, Simple Creatures, was announced in January 2019, with the lead single "Drug". The duo's first extended play, Strange Love, was released March 29 via BMG. The duo also announced a four date tour of the US and UK during March and April 2019, alongside two music festivals in Europe during Summer 2019.

In April 2019, shortly after the release of their Strange Love EP, the band confirmed in an interview that they have a second EP and a debut album ready to release in the near future.

On June 12, 2019, the band released "Special". Later that day, Gaskarth confirmed that it will be off an upcoming EP.

The band later released a video for "Special", and announced that their second EP Everything Opposite would be released in October 2019.

Musical style and influences
Simple Creatures' musical style has been described as pop, pop rock, synth-pop, electronic rock, and alternative rock. Hoppus and Gaskarth have described Simple Creatures' sound as "trash pop", which Hoppus has defined as "ratty guitars, big bombastic drum loops, [and] buzzy synths."

Both Hoppus and Gaskarth credited The Cure and its frontman, Robert Smith, as an influence on their first EP, Strange Love. "There were many, many times during the recording process that we referenced The Cure sounds, or the way that Robert Smith writes," Hoppus told Kerrang!. The music of the duo contains programmed drums, guitars, and synthesizers. Hoppus credited his longtime influences the Descendents and Bad Religion as an influence, stating that he and Gaskarth both come from a "catchy punk rock background." Lyrically, the duo hoped to imbue darker qualities and edginess into pop songs. "We’re both deeply sad people on the inside. That dark pop, goth, emo thing," Gaskarth said.

Band members
 Alex Gaskarth – vocals, guitars, keyboards, production, engineering (2019–present)
 Mark Hoppus – vocals, bass, keyboards, guitars, production, engineering (2019–present)

Discography
Extended plays
 Strange Love (2019)
 Everything Opposite (2019)

References

External links

American pop rock music groups
Musical groups established in 2019
Musical groups from California
Rock music duos
American musical duos
2019 establishments in California